DNA polymerase kappa is a DNA polymerase that in humans is encoded by the POLK gene. It is involved in translesion synthesis.

References

Further reading

External links 
 

DNA repair
DNA-binding proteins